Haato & co. (formerly Gelato di Crema) is a retailer of dessert based in Singapore, operating a chain of cafes, and run by the Dessert Empire Private Limited. A Haato cafe is run either by a franchisee or the corporation itself. Haato primarily sells gelato, yoghurt, sorbet, waffles, pastries, beverages and hot food. As of 2011, there are seven Haato outlets across Singapore.

References

External links
Official website

Companies of Singapore
Restaurant chains